Abbakumovo is the name of several rural localities in Russia:
Abbakumovo, Moscow Oblast, a village in Fedoskinskoye Rural Settlement of Mytishchinsky District in Moscow Oblast; 
Abbakumovo, Gagarinsky District, Smolensk Oblast, a village in Gagarinskoye Rural Settlement of Gagarinsky District in Smolensk Oblast; 
Abbakumovo, Novoduginsky District, Smolensk Oblast, a village in Tesovskoye Rural Settlement of Novoduginsky District in Smolensk Oblast; 
Abbakumovo, Tver Oblast, a village in Selishchenskoye Rural Settlement of Selizharovsky District in Tver Oblast; 
Abbakumovo, Vladimir, Vladimir Oblast, a village under the administrative jurisdiction of the City of Vladimir in Vladimir Oblast
Abbakumovo, Gus-Khrustalny District, Vladimir Oblast, a village in Gus-Khrustalny District of Vladimir Oblast
Abbakumovo, Petushinsky District, Vladimir Oblast, a village in Petushinsky District of Vladimir Oblast

See also
Abakumovo, several rural localities in Russia
Abakumov, Russian last name
Abbakumov, Russian last name